The Philippine Baseball League is the top baseball league in the Philippines sanctioned by the Philippine Amateur Baseball Association.

It was established in 2019 succeeding the Baseball Philippines league which folded in 2012 and the Charmain's and Commissioners' Cup of the Philippine Sports Commission in 2012. The league shares names with a defunct baseball league of the same name which was active in the 1980s.

2019 season
Two conferences were held in 2019. The first season and conference of the league commenced in January 2019. With six of the seven teams participating being collegiate teams also participating in the University Athletic Association of the Philippines (UAAP), the first conference also served as a pre-season event to the UAAP Season 81 baseball tournament. IPPC is the only non-UAAP team which comprises national team players not playing in the UAAP. Adamson University were the inaugural champions of the league defeating the De La Salle University in a one-game final of the league's first conference. Adamson managed to reach the knock-out stages despite finishing third with a 3–3 record in the elimination round.

The second conference of the league took place after the conclusion of the UAAP Baseball Championship. The second conference which started on May 18, 2019 is an Open Conference which featured 12 teams. The tournament is intended as a means to select players for the Philippine national baseball team that will play in the 2019 Southeast Asian Games.

Teams
A total of twelve teams participate in the league with five non-collegiate teams.

2019 Open Conference participants
Universities & Colleges
Adamson University
Ateneo de Manila University
De La Salle Green Batters
National University
University of the Philippines
University of Santo Tomas

Private & Public Entity
Itakura Parts Philippines Corporation Nationals
Philippine Air Force
RTU Thunder Alums
Thunderz All-Stars
Katayama Baseball Academy (KBA) Stars

Results

References

Baseball leagues in Asia
Baseball in the Philippines
2019 establishments in the Philippines
Professional sports leagues in the Philippines